Arthur Edwards Kimish (5 July 1917 – May 2001) was an English first-class cricketer. Kimish was a right-handed batsman who played primarily as a wicketkeeper.

Kimish represented Hampshire in three first-class match in the 1946 County Championship. Kimish made his debut against Leicestershire at Dean Park. Kimish played a further two first-class matches for the club, against Lancashire and finally Surrey.

Kimish died in Warwickshire in May 2001.

External links
Arthur Kimish at Cricinfo
Arthur Kimish at CricketArchive

1917 births
2001 deaths
Cricketers from Southampton
English cricketers
Hampshire cricketers